Draconyx (meaning "dragon claw") is a genus of dinosaur from the Late Jurassic. It was an ornithopod which lived in what is now Portugal and was a herbivore. It was found in the Lourinhã Formation in 1991, and described by Octávio Mateus and Miguel Telles Antunes in 2001.

Etymology
The type species, known from only partial remains, is Draconyx loureiroi. The generic name is derived from Latin draco, "dragon", and Ancient Greek ὄνυξ, onyx, "claw". The specific name is in honour of João de Loureiro, a Portuguese jesuit priest, a pioneer in Portuguese palaeontology.

Material
The holotype, ML 357, a partial skeleton lacking the skull, consists of two maxillary teeth, three caudal centra, one chevron, a distal epiphysis of right humerus, one manual phalanx, three manual unguals, a distal epiphysis of the right femur, the proximal and distal epiphyses of the tibia and fibula, an astragalus, a calcanaeum, three tarsals, four metatarsals and pedal phalanges. It was in 1991 found at Vale de Frades by Carlos Anunciação of the Museu da Lourinhã, in layers of the Bombarral Unit dating to the Tithonian.
Histology shows that the holotype specimen was between 27 and 31 years old.
A left femur (ML 434), found near Praia do Caniçal, has been referred to this taxon.
Draconyx was a small bipedal herbivore. Gregory S. Paul in 2010 estimated the length at 3.5 metres, the weight at 150 kilograms.

Systematics
According to Mateus and Antunes (2001), Draconyx loureiroi is a member of the Iguanodontia, more specifically the Camptosauridae, based on the maxillary teeth, which have a strong vertical primary ridge on the distal side of the labial crown, and the femur, which is curved and has a prominent lesser trochanter.
A article in 2022 places Draconyx as a Styracosterna.

Notes

External links
Mateus, O. & Antunes, M.T. (2001). "Draconyx loureiroi, a new Camptosauridae (Dinosauria: Ornithopoda) from the Late Jurassic of Lourinhã, Portugal". Annales de Paleontologie, 87(1): 61-73

Iguanodonts
Tithonian life
Late Jurassic dinosaurs of Europe
Jurassic Portugal
Fossils of Portugal
Lourinhã Formation
Fossil taxa described in 2001
Taxa named by Octávio Mateus
Taxa named by Miguel Telles Antunes
Ornithischian genera